(often ; from an Anglo-Norman phrase meaning "to speak the truth") is a legal phrase for a variety of procedures connected with jury trials. It originally referred to an oath taken by jurors to tell the truth. This term is also used informally to describe the practice of jury selection in certain jurisdictions.

Etymology 

According to the American Heritage Dictionary, it comes from the Anglo-Norman language.

The word  (or ), in this combination, comes from Old French and derives from Latin , "[that which is] true". It is related to the modern French word , meaning "indeed" (and in an obsolete sense, "truly"), but not to the more common word , "to see", which derives from Latin . However, the expression is now often interpreted by false etymology to mean "to see [them] say". The term is used (as ) in modern Canadian legal French.

Historic use
In earlier centuries, a challenge to a particular juror would be tried by other members of the jury panel, and the challenged juror would take an oath of voir dire, meaning to tell the truth. This procedure fell into disuse when the function of trying challenges to jurors was transferred to the judge.

Commonwealth countries, Ireland and Hong Kong 

In England and Wales, Cyprus, Hong Kong, Ireland, Australia, New Zealand, Papua New Guinea and Canada, it refers to a "trial within a trial". It is a hearing to determine the admissibility of evidence, or the competency of a witness or juror. As the subject matter of the voir dire often relates to evidence, competence or other matters that may lead to bias on behalf of the jury, the jury may be removed from the court for the voir dire.

Under Scots law, jury selection is random, and there are a few well-defined exclusions in criminal trials.

In Canada, the case of Erven v. The Queen holds that testimony on a voir dire cannot influence the trial itself. This remains true even if the judge ruled against the accused in the voir dire. The judge is assumed to ignore what he or she heard during voir dire. The jury is never present during a voir dire. However, since the evidence given at a voir dire may be redundant to evidence at trial, with the consent of the parties a procedure called a "blended voir dire" may be used to save time. In this procedure, evidence given in the voir dire, if then found admissible, is transferred into the main trial without having to be repeated.

In Australia, the rule about voir dire is in section 189 of the Evidence Act 1995 (Cth): "On a voir dire parties can call witnesses, cross-examine opponent's witnesses and make submissions- as they might in the trial proper." The term has thus been broadened in Australian jurisdictions to include any hearing during a trial where the jury is removed. The High Court of Australia has noted that the voir dire is an appropriate forum for the trial judge to reprimand counsel or for counsel to make submissions as to the running of the court to the trial judge.

United States 

In the United States, voir dire is the process by which prospective jurors are questioned about their backgrounds and potential biases before being chosen to sit on a jury. "Voir Dire is the process by which attorneys select, or perhaps more appropriately reject, certain jurors to hear a case." It also refers to the process by which expert witnesses are questioned about their backgrounds and qualifications before being allowed to present their opinion testimony in court. As noted above, in the United States (especially in practice under the Federal Rules of Evidence), voir dire can also refer to examination of the background of a witness to assess their qualification or fitness to give testimony on a given subject. Voir dire is often taught to law students in trial advocacy courses.

Colloquially, among attorneys and their staff, the term is used to describe the process of selecting a jury in some jurisdictions. Jury selection differs based on the court and locality where a trial occurs. The process of jury selection and managing voir dire is a key area of study for criminal trial attorneys. The Center for Jury Studies, a project of the National Center for State Courts, has studied voir dire, as has The American Bar Association.

See also 

 Law French
 Strike for cause

References

External links 

 Sample Voir Dire to Jury—United States Department of Justice (via Wayback Machine)
 Getting Jurors to Talk

Civil procedure
Criminal procedure
French legal terminology
Juries